The 19th Armored Battalion "M.O. Tumiati" is an inactive armored battalion of the Italian Army based in Florence in Tuscany. Originally the battalion, like all Italian tank units, was part of the infantry, but since 1 June 1999 it is part of the cavalry. Operationally the battalion was last assigned to the Motorized Brigade "Friuli".

History 
The battalion was formed during the 1975 army reform: on 23 September 1975 the XIX Armored Battalion of the Infantry Brigade "Friuli" was renamed 19th Armored Battalion "M.O. Tumiati". The 19th Tumiati was granted a new flag on 12 November 1976 by decree 846 of the President of the Italian Republic Giovanni Leone. The battalion received the traditions of the XIX Tank Battalion "M", which had been formed by the 31st Tank Infantry Regiment on l February 1942. The battalion, equipped with M15/42 tanks and Semoventi 75/34 self-propelled guns was assigned to the 215th Coastal Division. Together with Royal Italian Navy units and the civilian population the battalion fought German forces, which tried to occupy Piombino on 10 September 1943, two days after the announcement of the Armistice of Cassibile. After the Battle of Piombino the battalion retreated to the countryside and destroyed its tanks, before its personnel dispersed.

After World War II the XIX battalion was reformed in Florence in 1959 as armored unit of the Infantry Brigade "Friuli".

Tank and armored battalions created during the 1975 army reform were all named for officers, soldiers and partisans, who were posthumously awarded Italy's highest military honor the Gold Medal of Military Valour for heroism during World War II. The 19th Tank Battalion's name commemorated 32nd Tank Infantry Regiment Second Lieutenant Francesco Tumiati, who had served in the Western Desert Campaign in 1941-1942 and joined a partisan unit after the German occupation of Italy in 1943. After 8 months as commander of a partisan detachment Tumiati was caught by German forces and executed on 17 May 1944. Equipped with M47 Patton tanks and M113 armored personnel carriers the battalion joined the Motorized Brigade "Friuli".

After the end of the Cold War the Italian Army began to draw down its forces and the 19th Armored Battalion was disbanded on 6 May 1991 in preparation for the merger of the Motorized Brigade "Friuli" and Mechanized Brigade "Trieste" on 1 June 1991.

See also 
 Motorized Brigade "Friuli"

References

Tank Battalions of Italy